This Thing Called Love is a 1940 American romantic comedy film directed by Alexander Hall and starring Rosalind Russell and Melvyn Douglas as newlyweds with an odd arrangement: the wife insists on not sleeping together for a trial period. It is the second film adaptation of the play of the same name by Edwin Burke: the 1929 version, which shares the same title, is believed to be lost.

The film was condemned by the Catholic Legion of Decency as "contrary to the Christian concept of marriage".

Cast
Rosalind Russell as Ann Winters
Melvyn Douglas	as Tice Collins
Binnie Barnes as Charlotte Campbell
Allyn Joslyn as Harry Bertrand
Gloria Dickson as Florence Bertrand
Lee J. Cobb as Julio Diestro
Gloria Holden as Genevieve Hooper
Paul McGrath as Gordon Daniels
Leona Maricle as Ruth Howland (as Leona Maride)
Don Beddoe as Tom Howland
 Rosina Galli as Mrs. Diestro
Sig Arno as Arno

See also
List of films condemned by the Legion of Decency

References

External links

American romantic comedy films
American black-and-white films
Films directed by Alexander Hall
1940 films
Columbia Pictures films
1940 romantic comedy films
Films produced by William Perlberg
1940s American films
1940s English-language films